Svetloyarsky District is an administrative district (raion), one of the thirty-three in Volgograd Oblast, Russia. As a municipal division, it is incorporated as Svetloyarsky Municipal District. Its administrative center is the urban locality (a work settlement) of Svetly Yar. Population:  39,384 (2002 Census);  The population of Svetly Yar accounts for 32.7% of the district's total population.

Geography
The district is located in the southeast of the oblast, in the area of the Volga Upland and the Yergeni hills.

References

Notes

Sources

Districts of Volgograd Oblast